is a private university in Nishi-ku, Kumamoto, Japan. The predecessor of the school was founded in 1949, and it was chartered as a junior college in 1965. After becoming a four-year college in 1967, it adopted the present name in 2000. In 2001 Japanese Course for foreign students was opened. In 2004 Graduate School of Art was established, division of Fine Art Master Course and division of Design Master Course was opened and applied Life Science Master Course and applied Life Science Doctoral Course opened.

References

External links
 Official website

 
Educational institutions established in 1967
Private universities and colleges in Japan
Universities and colleges in Kumamoto Prefecture